Butler Farm is located in Swedesboro, Gloucester County, New Jersey, United States. The farm was added to the National Register of Historic Places on December 1, 1978.

See also
National Register of Historic Places listings in Gloucester County, New Jersey

References

Houses on the National Register of Historic Places in New Jersey
Federal architecture in New Jersey
Houses in Gloucester County, New Jersey
Farms on the National Register of Historic Places in New Jersey
National Register of Historic Places in Gloucester County, New Jersey
New Jersey Register of Historic Places
Swedesboro, New Jersey